The Clarke Island (also known by its Indigenous name of Lungtalanana Island), part of the Furneaux Group, is an  island in Bass Strait, south of Cape Barren Island, about  off the northeast coast of Tasmania, Australia. Banks Strait separates the island from Cape Portland on the mainland.

Off its west coast lies the shipwreck of HMS Litherland, which sank in 1853 and was discovered in 1983. Clarke Island is Tasmania's eighth largest island.

History
Clarke Island/Lungtalanana was uninhabited prior to European settlement. Sydney Cove ran aground between Preservation Island and Rum Island on 28 February 1797. This was led by first mate Hugh Thompson, and included William Clark the supercargo, three European seamen and twelve lascars. Ill fortune struck again and they were wrecked on the mainland at the northern end of Ninety Mile Beach.

They had few provisions and no ammunition, and fatigue and hunger lessened their number as they marched.  Along the way they encountered various Aboriginal Tasmanians, some friendly and some not.  The last of the party to die on the march was killed by a man Dilba and his people near Hat Hill.  Those people had a reputation around Port Jackson for being ferocious. Matthew Flinders and George Bass had feared for their safety when they encountered Dilba the previous year.

In May 1797 the three survivors of the march, William Clark, sailor John Bennet and one lascar had made it to the cove at Wattamolla and, on 15 May 1797, with their strength nearly at an end they were able to signal a boat out fishing, which took them on to Sydney.

On the march Clark had noted coal in the cliffs at what is now called Coalcliff between Sydney and Wollongong. This was the first coal found in Australia. On arrival at Port Jackson, the men informed Governor Hunter of the Sydney Cove and its remaining crew. Hunter despatched the Francis and the Eliza to salvage the ship and take the remaining crew and cargo to Port Jackson.

On the first salvage trip, the crew of the Francis discovered wombats on the island and a live animal was taken back to Port Jackson. Matthew Flinders travelling on board the Francis on its third and final salvage trip also decided to take a wombat specimen from the island to Port Jackson. Governor Hunter later sent the animal's corpse to Joseph Banks at the Literary and Philosophical Society to verify it as a new species. The island was named Clarke island after William Clark.

Sealing is believed to taken place on the island early in the 19th century.

Recent developments

The root fungus pathogen, Phytophthora cinnamomi, known to be able to kill Australian native plants was found in the island in an isolated case, in 2002.

Introduced animals still inhabiting the island include rabbits, cats and rats. In January 2023, a project to remove the feral cats to protect a colony of vulnerable white-fronted terns (Sterna striata) nesting on the island began.

On 10 May 2005, the government released Crown lands on both Cape Barren and Clarke Island to be overseen by the local Aboriginal association. This marked the first official handover of Crown land to an Aboriginal community in Tasmania. , Clarke Island had one permanent resident. Current infrastructure is limited and ageing.

Topography
A prominent feature of Clarke Island is a central plateau that rises . This inland highland provides a limited water catchment from which water flows directly to the sea. To the East of the Island are a collection of white beaches in the Rutherford Cove area.

See also

 List of islands of Tasmania

References

Furneaux Group
Islands of Bass Strait
Islands of North East Tasmania
Seal hunting
Private islands of Tasmania